Jules Diéterle (8 February 1811 – 22 April 1889) was a 19th-century French architect, also a draftsman, painter, painter on porcelain, sculptor and theatre decorator.

Biography 

Born in Paris, Diéterle, son of Jean Georges Diéterle, piano maker, and Marie-Antoinette Terrasson born in Paris on 8 February 1811 was a very versatile artist. He started with the painter-decorator Hugues Martin, then joined the Dockain wallpaper factory,  in Paris.

Diéterle later joined Pierre-Luc-Charles Ciceri's workshop (1782-1868). In June 1832, he worked at the Paris Opera on the sets of La tentation, a five acts opéra-ballet by Jean Coralli. In 1833, with Charles Séchan (1803–1874), a student of Ciceri, he founded an association under the name Séchan et Diéterle.  joined them, followed by Édouard Desplechin. From 1832 until 1848, his career as a decorator merged with those of his collaborators, but their association was dissolved in 1849. That last year, Diéterle restored the Galerie d'Apollon at the Louvre with Séchan.

At the same time, he entered the manufacture nationale de Sèvres as a master artist in 1840. From 1852 to 1855, he was head of art works. Diéterle had the Second French Empire as a sponsor and realized a service in a style called Pompeian for prince Napoleon.

Diéterle married on 2 May 1843 in Paris with Émilie Louise Honorine Gardie daughter of Jean Louis Gardie and Ann Nugent Woodger. From this union were born four children: Georges Pierre Diéterle on 25 March 1844, Louise Emma Diéterle on 20 August 1845, Charles Jules Diéterle on 6 April 1847 and Anne Marguerite Diéterle on 3 May 1853.

In 1848, he was president of the Higher Council for the Improvement of the Gobelins, Beauvais, and Sèvres manufactories. In 1852, Séchan and Diéterle went to Constantinople where they were responsible for carrying out the interior decorations in the Sultan Abdulmejid I palaces.

Séchan unofficially became Diéterle's "stepfather". Indeed, he lived in a marriage from 1851 with Ann Nugent Woodger, separated from her husband and mother of Émilie Louise Honorine Gardie.

Édouard Bénazet (1801–1867), a French businessman, fermier des jeux and successor in this capacity to his father Jacques Bénazet (1778–1848) entrusted Séchan, Diéterle and his brother-in-law, Louis Jules Haumont, with the decoration of the four lounges of the casino, nicknamed the "Maison de Conversation" in Baden-Baden in 1853.

Diéterle was made a chevalier of the Légion d'honneur on 14 August 1852, before being promoted an officer on 15 July 1867.

Diéterle and his friend, judge François-Alexandre Metzinger stayed in Yport in 1856 at the Tougard Hotel. Under the charm of the Normandy coast, they returned the following years with a few friends such as Jean-Paul Laurens, Julien Gorgeu (Parisian banker, mayor of Yport) and Alfred Nunès (Parisian bank clerk, cousin of the painter Camille Pissarro, mayor of Yport).

In 1863, he built the villa "Les Charmilles" in Yport, while his eldest son Georges Diéterle, moved to a farm in 1870 in Criquebeuf-en-Caux, "La ferme des roses". During the Franco-Prussian war, Jules Diéterle's mother, Marie-Antoinette Terrasson, took refuge in Yport. During the Siege of Paris the capital was then surrounded by German troops and many inhabitants fled the city. In July 1872, the painter Camille Corot stayed with the Diéterle family in Yport and Criquebeuf-en-Caux. Upon the death of Diéterle, the villa in Yport was sold to the landscape painter and portraitist  (1854–1937).

In 1876, Diéterle became a director of the Beauvais Manufactory and then president of the Union centrale des arts décoratifs. He resigned in 1882 for health reasons.

Diéterle died on 22 April 1889 in his home at 68  in the 8th arrondissement of Paris.

Family 
Among Diéterle's descendants are many artists, including his daughter, Marguerite Diéterle, who married  from Châtel-Censoir, painter and director of the Gobelins and Beauvais manufacturies. His great-grandson Hubert de Givenchy is one of the most important couturiers of the 20th century.

Another of his children is the draughtsman, painter and architect, Georges Diéterle (1844–1937), and one of Jules Diéterle's granddaughters is Yvonne Diéterle (1882–1974), sculptor and painter, wife of Jean-Pierre Laurens, also a painter.

His other son was Charles Diéterle (1847-1933), a painter, husband of Marie Van Marcke de Lummen called Marie Diéterle (1856-1935), a painter.

Works 
Drawings and paintings
 Drawing of a Renaissance palace, with loggia and stairs: pencil on paper (37.5 x 60.3 cm), sold by Sotheby's London 13 April 1992<.
 Oil on canvas entitled "Hunting Trophy" (dated 1892); tapestry carton for the decoration of the Élysée Palace; housed at the Mobilier National in 1892, transferred to the Roubaix Museum (inventory number: 6103-1086-5) 
 Portrait of a sitting woman (oil on canvas, 107 x 73 cm), signed and dated 1874, sold by Christophe Joron-Derem 8 November 2006.

"Objets d'art" from French public collections.
 " Vase Diéterle ", or et couleurs  
 " Vase Rimini "  
 " Vase de Chantilly " : nouvelles de la Guerre 
 " Service Pompéien " du Prince Napoléon  
 " Paire de vases Ly »
 " Coupe de Rivoli ", fond céladon, décor or et couleurs  
 " Vase à quatre lobes ", d'une paire, fond bleu, riche décor en or de style persan  
 " Pièces pour le service pompéien du prince Napoléon "; à fond rouge pompéien 
 " Paire de vases Rimini " à anses en forme de serpent  
 " Vase Diéterle " élément d'une paire à fond céladon et décor or avec fleurs peintes

Bibliography

Notes and references

Notes

References

External links 

 Jules Pierre Diéterlé at Drouot
 

1811 births
1889 deaths
Painters from Paris
19th-century French painters
Officiers of the Légion d'honneur